is a Japanese actress and television personality.

Career
In 1997, she entered the entertainment industry with the Japan Artists Office's "29th Newcomer Presentation", and debuted as the heroine of the 1998 television drama Athena (TV Tokyo, late nights). After the same work, her artist name became . After that, she works extensively with television, advertising, films, stage, gravure, etc. From 2003, she returned her stage name to her real name, . Her older brother is Arm Wrestling All Japan Champion Masahiro Otani.

She announced that she left San Music at the end of 2008 at her own blog Teni Muhō on 1 January 2009 (1 January 2009 – paused until 23 April 2009, 24 April 2009 – continued until 19 July 2009, afterwards "Teni Muhō" ended.)

Her comments (backyard story) were posted on the memorial article of Miyuki Kanbe who died suddenly on 18 June 2008. She co-starred with Kanbe in "Momo no Tennensui" (2000) and "Kyoto Chiken no Onna (3)" (2006), Kanbe said that Otani was "a cool woman."

From 2012, she transferred to Fujiga Office and returned to her stage name  to resume activities.

She is represented with Fujiga Office.

Personal life

She was born from Suzuka, Mie and graduated from Horikoshi High School.

She obtained the 2008 Vegetable Sommelier and the 2009 Mental Psychology Counselor Qualification.

On 16 April 2014 her official blog "Otani-san" restarted.

It was reported that she was married on her official blog on 23 February 2015.

Filmography

TV dramas

NHK General TV
Okami ni narimasu (2003)
Tensai Terebi-kun Tentere Drama Shōnen Keiji Suiri-kun (2005)
Mei Tantei Akafuji Taka "ABC Satsujin Jiken"
Doyō Drama
Tama Moe! (2006)
Hitogata Nagashi (2007) – as new announcer: Kaori Otani
Kansa Hōjin (2008) – as Kasumi Yoshida
TV 60-nen Multi-channel Drama Hōsō Hakubutsukan Kikiippatsu (2013) – as Nanami Suzukawa

Nippon TV
Kayō Suspense Gekijō
Tōban Bengoshi (8) (1999) – as Yoko Kajiwara
Kodokuna Kajitsu (2000) – as Mika Awano
Kinkyū Kyūmei Byōin (1) (2001) – as Mizuki Takada
Keishichō Kanshikihan (2002)
Densetsu no Kyōshi (2000)
Shinjuku Bōsō Kyūkyū-tai Episode 4 "Food Poisoning Big Panic! Killing Alumni Association!!" (2000) – as Junko Ochiai
Shijō Saiaku no Date Episode 7 "There is No Toilet!" (2000) – as Reiko
Tantei Kazoku (2002) – Episode 5 "Kidnapping Incident!? Genius Boy Name Detective Birth! My Wife is Not a Housekeeper" – as Aoi Sato
Nurse Man Special (2004)
Kayō Drama Gold Hei no Naka no Korinai Onna-tachi 2 (2006) as Yuki Ninomiya
Nipponshi Suspense Gekijō Saigen Drama (15 Oct 2008) – as Oeyo
Nipponshi Suspense Gekijō Tokubetsu Kikaku Tōdai Rakujō (14 Jan 2009) – as Tomoko Abe

Tokyo Broadcasting System Television
Getsuyō Mystery Gekijō Manbiki G-Men Yuki Nikaido (7) (2001)
Morning Musume Suspense Drama Special Mikeneko Homes no Hanzai-gaku Kōza (2002)
Ai no Gekijō Yoiko no Mikata (2004) – as Moe Tachikawa
Getsuyō Mystery Gekijō
Tax Inspector Madogiwa Taro: Case File 12 (10 Jan 2005) – as Miki Tachibana
Hideo Yokoyama Mystery Neta-moto (2005) – as Kano
Suiyō Premier Yaoh (2005) – as Erika
Mikka Okure no Happy New Year! (2007) – as Ayaka Yagi
Usagi ga mochi-tsuki (BS-TBS, 2007) – as Naoko Majima
Usagi-tachi no mochi-tsuki (BS-TBS, 2008) – as Naoko Majima
Hanzawa Naoki Episode 2 (2013)

Fuji Television
Hanamura Daisuke Episode 5 "2 Billion Heritage Please Give Me" (KTV, 2000) – as Rina Morishita
Rookie! (KTV, 2001)
Kinyō Entertainment Hama no Shizuka wa Jiken ga Osuki Episode 4 (2006) – as Former student of Shizuka: Rina
Oniyome Nikki Īyudana Episode 11 "What is Wrong with Demon Bride" (KTV, 2007) – as Emi
Team Batista no Eikō Episode 4 (KTV, 2008) – as Taeko Kawakami
Suzuko no Koi (THK, 2012) – as Natsuko
Kyūmei Byōtō 24-ji Episode 2 (2013)
Dr. Kenji Morohashi 2 (2014) – as Tomoko Ochiai
Hottokenai Majo-tachi (THK, 2014) – as Yukari Okabe
Love Love Alien Episode 27 (22 Sep 2016) – as Beauty salon customer
Kirawa reru Yūki (2017) – as Maho Tamura
Kinyō Premium Hanji Shikkaku!? Bengoshi Rentaro Natsume no Gyakuten Sōsa (24 Mar 2017) – as Manami Yamashina

TV Asahi
Change! (ABC, 1999)
Oyaji Tantei 1st Series (Mokuyō Mystery, 2001)
Seicho Matsumoto Botsugo 10 Nenkinen Chō Komi (2 Mar 2002) – as Yuzuki (protagonist)'s daughter
Shopping Hero (2002)
Omiyasan 2nd Series File No.02 (2003) – Guest
Shin Kyoto Meikyūan Nai 2 Episode 5 (2004) – Guest
Yonaoshi Junan! Ninjōken (Getsuyō Jidaigeki, 2005)
Keiji Heya Episode 7 (2005) – as Detective of the Boys' Chief: Miho
Kyoto Chiken no Onna Dai 3 Series (2006) – as Judicial Student: Nana Kagizaki
Taikō-ki – Tenka o Totta Otoko Hideyoshi (2006) – as Asahi
Tokumei Kakarichō Hitoshi Tadano 3rd Season Episode 25 (2007) – Guest
Aibō
(2007) – as Kanako Soejima
(2016) – Sakurako Oda
Keishichō Sōsaikka 9 Kakari season 7 Episode 4 (25 Jul 2012) – as Eri Yoshinaga
Yuri Chika e Mama kara no Dengon (NBN, 26 Jan 2013)
Kyoto Ninjō Sōsa File Episode 3 (14 May 2015)
Keishichō Sōsaikkachō Final Episode (23 Jun 2016) – as Mizuho Ota
Iryū Sōsa (2017) – as Toko Shida
Doyō Wide Gekijō
Jikkyō chūkei sa reta Renzoku Satsujin! Nozoku Onna (2002)
Kurumaisu no Bengoshi Takeshi Mizushima Watashi wa Mizushima no Musumedesu! Satsujin Yōgi-sha no Joshidai-sei ga Igaina Kokuhaku! (26 Oct 2002) – as Atsuko Hirose
Keiji no Tsuma – Dekatsuma
Miwaku no Kurokami Renzoku Satsujin Otto ni Taiho sa reta Kyōaku-han ga Shussho shita! Fukushū ka? Tsuma o Nerau Ayashī Kage… (30 Jul 2005) – as Emi Mitsui
Tsumanouwaki Check ga Furin Renzoku Satsujin o Yobu! Watashi no Otto ga Hannin nante… Zettaizetsumei no Tsuma ga Saigonokake (8 Aug 2009) – as Emi Mitsui
Onsenwaka okami no Satsujin Suiri
(18) Izumo – Tamatsukurionsen, Emmusubi Renzoku Satsujin!! Daikyō o mi kuji ga Jiken o Yobu!? (14 Jan 2007) – as Chika Takano
(27) Shikoku Kagawa – Shoya ni Korosa reta Seto no Hanayome (1 Mar 2014) – as Mako Kudo
Kyoto Minami-sho Kanshiki File Shinise Ryōtei – Misshitsu Renzoku Satsujin!! (25 Jul 2009) – as Manami Sone
Kenji Yoko Asahina (13) Hannin ga Gyōretsu suru Ropeway, Hyōkō 932 m Satsujin Trick… (9 Mar 2013) – as Yuko Tajima
Otorisōsa-kan Shiho Kitami (18) Kōfuku no Zetchō Bijo Renzoku Satsujin! (5 Apr 2014) – as Masumi Nakane
Shūchakueki no Ushio Keiji vs Jiken Kisha Saeko (14) Mochū Ketsurei (27 Dec 2014) – as Eri Asakura

TV Tokyo
Athena (1998)
Onna to Ai to Mystery Yame Ken Bengoshi Hidetake Choku Sadogashima Satsujin Kō (28 Jul 2002) – as Emari
Seiichi Morimura Mystery Onna to Ai to Mystery Sōsasenjō no Aria (2003)
Vampire Host Episode 5 (2004) – as Hitomi Kurusu
The Great Horror Family (2004)
Uramiya Honpo Episode 8 (2006) – as Yayoi Ono
Suiyō Mystery 9
Ginza Kōkyū Club Mama Miyuki Aoyama Nyotei Battle Satsujin Chōbo (2006)
Kita Alps Sangaku Kyūjotai Ikki Shimon (10) Hakuba Karamatsudake Satsujin Route (Mar 2008) – as Shizuko Makimura
Sōgi-ya Matsuko no Jiken-bo (4) (12 Mar 2014) – as Aki Hayashiba
Rambling Fish (2006, KBS) – as Reiko Okajima
Elite Yankee Saburō (2007) – as Midori

Others
Dunichi Love (2003) – Episode 5 "On the Weekend, Saigo-san." – as Flower shop clerk: Kiyoko

Films
Eko Eko Azarak (2001)
Hashire! Ichirō (2001, Toei Company) – as Mariko Yoshimura
Tenshi ga Orita Hi Dai 3-wa "Tenshi no Countdown"
Gun Crazy 3: Traitor's Rhapsody (2003)
Shūdan Satsujin Club Returns (2003) – as Mihoko
Hayate -Basement Fight- (2004)
Mail in the site (2004)
Usagi no mochi-tsuki (2004) – as Naoko Majima
Kuinige Couple Jigoku no Tōsō 5 Man Kilo (2004, NetCinema.TV) – as Kyoko
Usagi no mochi-tsuki 2 (2005) – as Naoko Majima
Cool Dimension (2006)
Usagi-tachi no mochi-tsuki (2008, NetCinema.TV) – as Naoko Majima
Orite yuku Ikikata (2009) – as Maiko Ishihara

Direct-to-video
Chance Meeting (Nov 2003, Bunkasha)
Minami no Teiō Special Ver.50 Gekijō-ban "Kanekashi no Okite" (2004, KSS) – as Hostess: Mayumi

Stage
Musical Shōkōshi Cedy
Takuramakan '05 (7–12 Jun 2005, Nakano The Pocket)
Takuramakan '06 (Production: Screenwriter Takehiko Hata, 17–19 Aug 2006, Sapporo Kaoru 2.7 Hall/21–22 Aug, Furano Plays Factory) – Lead role: as Kei

Advertisements
Toyota Tercel Corsa Corolla II Special Car (1998)
Sato Foods
Unicharm
Momo no Tennensui (Japan Tobacco)
Esprique Precious (KOSÉ, interlocked with the drama "Mikka Okure no Happy New Year!")

Others
Warauinu no Bōken (CX)
Odoru! Sanma Goden!! (NTV – Guest
Shinnosuke Furumoto Cha para suka Woo! (NCB)
Tokyo Disney Sea 5th Anniversary Web Cinema "Sea of Dreams" Episode 2 Subarashiki Hanaji Biyori – as Maya
V6 Special DVD Sorezore no Sora -Drama Story Clip- (2007, Avex Entertainment)
Access no Daishō –Anata no Shiranai Net no Uragawa– (Japan Police Support Association)

Released works

Photo albums
virgin (Nov 2000, Shooting: Toshiaki Matsugi, Gakken)
Honey (Nov 2002, Shooting: Yoshinobu Nemoto, Kindaieigasha)
Soul (Apr 2003, Shooting: Tetsuo Nogami, Pioneer LDC) – Film Gun Crazy photo album
Chance Meeting (Oct 2003, Shooting: Hide T. Shimazaki, Bunkasha)
Mitsuho Otani (Mar 2004, Shooting: Hidekazu Maiyama, Wani Books)

DVD
Junkie (26 Jul 2002 (VHS)/2 Aug 2002 (DVD), DooGA)
Mitsuho Otani in Gun Crazy/Soul (25 Apr 2003, Geneon Entertainment) – Gun Crazy making DVD
Baby Blue (25 Apr 2014, Takeshobo)

 Omnibus
Kasumi Nakane & Mitsuho Otani in Gun Crazy/Passion & Soul (Sep 2003, Geneon Entertainment)

References

External links

 – Fujiga Office 
 
 – Ameba Blog 
 

1982 births
Living people
Japanese idols
Japanese actresses
Horikoshi High School alumni
People from Mie Prefecture